Crime of the Century is the third studio album by the English rock band Supertramp, released in September 1974 on A&M Records. Crime of the Century was Supertramp's commercial breakthrough in many countries, most notably in the UK, Canada and Germany where it peaked in the Top 5 while also making the Top 20 in Australia and France.  It was an improvement over their previous sales in the US, but still only peaked at No. 38, with the US hit being "Bloody Well Right". "School" was another popular track, particularly at album rock-oriented radio stations. The album was eventually certified Gold in the US in 1977 after the release of Even in the Quietest Moments.... In Canada, it was eventually certified Diamond (sales of one million copies). The album was Supertramp's first to feature drummer Bob Siebenberg (at the time credited as Bob C. Benberg), saxophone and clarinet player and vocalist John Helliwell, bassist Dougie Thomson, and co-producer Ken Scott. The album has received critical acclaim, including its inclusion in Rolling Stones "50 Greatest Prog Rock Albums of All Time".

The album's dedication reads "To Sam", which is a nickname for Stanley August Miesegaes, the Dutch millionaire who supported the band financially from 1969 to 1972.

Background and recording

After the failure of their first two albums and an unsuccessful tour, it looked like the end of Supertramp, but Rick Davies and Roger Hodgson built it up from there, recruiting new members, drummer Bob C. Benberg, woodwinds player and backing vocalist John Helliwell, and bassist Dougie Thomson. Their record label, A&M, in particular A&R man Dave Margereson (who would become their manager for the next ten years), sent this new line-up to a seventeenth-century farm in west Dorset in order to rehearse together and prepare the album.

The album was recorded at several studios, including Trident Studios and Ramport Studios (owned by The Who), with co-producer Ken Scott. While recording the album, Davies and Hodgson recorded approximately 42 demo songs, from which only 8 were chosen to appear on the album. Several other tracks appeared on later albums (Crisis? What Crisis?, ...Famous Last Words...).

Due to a contractual agreement, all the songs are credited jointly to the two writers, but some of the songs were written individually. Scott commented that Davies and Hodgson "were very, very different personalities. Those differing personalities made the music sound the way it did."  "Asylum", "Rudy" and "Bloody Well Right" were written by Davies, "Dreamer", "If Everyone Was Listening", and "Hide in Your Shell" were written by Hodgson, and both "School" and "Crime of the Century" are Davies/Hodgson collaborations.

Hodgson remarked of "Hide in Your Shell": "I was 23 when I wrote that song, confused about life and like a lot of people are at that age, trying to hide my insecurities. I’ve always been able to express my innermost feelings more openly in song and 'Hide in Your Shell' came to me at a time when I was feeling very lonely – lonely both in life and within the band – with no one who shared my spiritual quest."

"Dreamer" was composed by Hodgson on his Wurlitzer piano at his mother's house when he was 19 years old. At that time he recorded a demo of the song using vocals, Wurlitzer, and banging cardboard boxes for percussion. Hodgson recalled: "I was excited – it was the first time I laid hands on a Wurlitzer." Supertramp cut their own recording of the song in imitation of this early demo. Also, Hodgson stated on In the Studio with Redbeard while talking about the making of the album that the band had difficulty recreating the song when recording it.

Another of Hodgson's philosophical musings, "If Everyone Was Listening", was inspired by the As You Like It adage "All the world’s a stage, and all the men are merely players". According to Entertainment Weekly, the message of the song is, "Not knowing what’s going on in everyone’s mind is just another form of not being in control. The fear comes not from the absence of knowledge of another person’s thought process, but rather from confronting the fact that we have no control over anything." The song would later provide the title track for Michael Ball's 2014 album of the same name.

The album was named after the final song, "Crime of the Century", which the band members felt was the strongest song on the album. Shortly after his departure from Supertramp, Hodgson commented: "I've had more people come up to me and say that that song touched them more deeply than any other. That song really came together when we were living together at Southcombe Farm, Thorncombe, and just eating, sleeping, and breathing the ideas for the album. The song just bounced between Rick and I for so many weeks before it finally took form." For unknown reasons, in several interviews both before and since, Hodgson has attributed the song as being written solely by Davies.

Hodgson describes "School" as "my song basically" but admits that Davies wrote both the piano solo and a good deal of the lyrics. Interviewed by Jeff Parets of Acoustic Storm in 2010, Hodgson confirmed that the song was based on his experience at boarding school and said of the girl's scream: "Everything, especially that scream that you're talking about just before the band comes in, does represent a lot... I mean, you know, school is a wonderful place. Obviously, it's a school playground but that scream does represent a lot more."  Ultimate Classic Rock critic Nick DeRiso rated "School" as Supertramp's 3rd greatest song, calling it a "jazz fusion-informed gem" and praising its "free-form creativity," "plaintive lyric" and "stirring musical specificity."

On the In the Studio with Redbeard episode devoted to the album, Hodgson stated that "Rudy" was the character on the album and was seen as somewhat autobiographical of Davies' life at the time. The sound of the train in "Rudy" was recorded at London Paddington station, while the crowd noises in the song were taken from Leicester Square.

Hodgson and Davies both stated that communication within the group was at a peak during the recording of this album, while drummer Siebenberg stated that he thought it was this album on which the band hit its "artistic peak".

Crime of the Century deals loosely with themes of loneliness and mental stability, but is not a concept album. Davies consciously linked the opening track "School" to "Bloody Well Right" with the line "So you think your schooling is phoney", and according to Hodgson, any unifying thread beyond that was left to the listener's imagination.

Artwork
The photograph for the cover was Paul Wakefield's first album work. A&M Records' art director Fabio Nicoli invited Wakefield to the studio where the band were recording and had him read the lyrics. With the album title already chosen, Wakefield started asking himself "what an appropriate sentence could be for 'the crime of the century'" and combined it with a line from the song "Asylum": "when they haunt me and taunt me in my cage." One of his ideas, a prison cell window floating in space with a person silently screaming through the bars, was approved by the band, and when Wakefield started to develop the idea, he reduced the prisoner to just hands clutching the bars, "a resignation to fate that the other didn’t have. It felt like there would be no reprieve." A friend made the set of polished aluminum bars and welded it to a stand, and underneath it Wakefield's twin brother grabbed the bars, with his hands whitened with stage make-up. Through multiple exposure, Wakefield shot 12 pictures on transparency film, which he then combined with a back-lit starscape, that was actually a black card sheet filled with holes in a darkened studio. Half of the resulting pictures had the expected result. The back cover photograph, featuring band members in their underwear holding dress suits and top hats, was originally made when the album cover was meant to be a gatefold.

Reception

Crime of the Century was Supertramp's first U.S. Top 40 album and was eventually certified Gold in the U.S. in 1977, after the release of Even in the Quietest Moments.... The album also marked the commercial breakthrough for the band in the United Kingdom; Crime of the Century peaked at number four in the album chart in March 1975, and "Dreamer" reached number thirteen on the singles chart in the same month. The album was particularly successful in Canada, staying on the album chart for over two years, peaking at number four, and being certified Diamond (10 x platinum) signifying sales of over one million copies.

In 1978, Crime of the Century was ranked 108th in The World Critic Lists, which recognised the 200 greatest albums of all time as voted for by notable rock critics and DJs. Village Voice critic Robert Christgau was ambivalent towards the album's "straight-ahead art-rock", which he called "Queen without preening. Yes without pianistics and meter shifts." Adam Thomas's retrospective review in Sputnikmusic described it as one of the better albums of the 1970s for its powerful expression of young adult confusion and alienation, and for its consistent contrast between prog and pop elements.

In the 1987 edition of The World Critic Lists, CBC's Geoff Edwards ranked Crime of the Century the 10th greatest album of all time. A 1998 public poll, aggregating the votes of more than 200,000 music fans, saw Crime of the Century voted among the all-time top 1000 albums, and it was listed in the 2005 book 1001 Albums You Must Hear Before You Die. In 2015, it was chosen as the 27th greatest progressive rock album by Rolling Stone. Paul Elliott of Classic Rock magazine called it a progressive rock masterpiece.

Many of the songs on the album remained staples of the band's shows well into the 21st century ("School", "Bloody Well Right", "Rudy", and the title song). Almost all of the album appears on the band's 1980 live album Paris although the tracks that feature orchestrations on the studio versions ("Asylum", "Rudy", and "Crime of the Century") were replaced by string synthesisers or Oberheim synthesisers, which were played mainly by Helliwell with some help from Hodgson. Hodgson has also included songs from the album ("Dreamer", "Hide in Your Shell", "School" and "If Everyone Was Listening") in his concerts.

Releases
The first release was on vinyl by A&M Records in 1974. In 1977, it became the first pop music LP title re-issued by the audiophile label Mobile Fidelity Sound Lab. A&M released it as one of the first CDs in its "Audio Master Plus" series in 1984, which it then reissued in 1990. Mobile Fidelity also released its own remastered CD version on a gold disc as part of its "Ultradisc" series, in November 1984.

A new remastered CD version of the album was released by A&M in 1997, followed by a different remaster on 11 June 2002. The newer A&M remasters feature all of the album art restored plus credits and full lyrics, which were missing from some earlier editions. Both 1997 and 2002 A&M remasters were from the original tapes by Greg Calbi and Jay Messina at Sterling Sound in New York.

The 1997 remaster has all tracks peaking at 100 percent, significantly altering the original dynamic range of the recording and effectively adding new distortion to the sound.  The 2002 edition is not quite as loud but still has much of the same effect.

The album was re-issued by German audiophile label Speaker's Corner in 1999, as a 180 gram vinyl LP. It has none of the dynamic range compression applied to the A&M remastered CD versions.

It was announced in October 2014 that the album, remastered by Ray Staff, would be reissued in CD, digital download, and 180g vinyl formats on 9 December 2014. In addition to the original album, the release would include a complete recording of a 1975 Hammersmith Odeon concert, a 24-page booklet of photographs, and an essay written by Phil Alexander with new interviews with Ken Scott, Dave Margereson, and most of the band members. Two 10×8 prints and a longer version of the essay were announced as exclusives of the vinyl version.

Track listing

PersonnelSupertrampRick Davies – vocals, keyboards, harmonica
Roger Hodgson – vocals, guitar, pianos
John Anthony Helliwell – saxophones, clarinet, backing vocals
Dougie Thomson – bass guitar
Bob Siebenberg (credited as Bob C. Benberg) – drums, percussionAdditional musicians Christine Helliwell – backing vocals (3)
 Scott Gorham – backing vocals (3)
 Vicky Siebenberg – backing vocals (3)
 Anonymous street musician – saw (3)
 Ken Scott – water gong (8)Production'
 Ken Scott – producer, engineer
 Supertramp – producer
 John Jansen – engineer
 Ray Staff – original vinyl mastering
 Richard Hewson – string arrangements
 Paul Wakefield – cover design and photography
 Pabio Nicoli – art direction

Charts

Weekly charts

Year-end charts

Certifications and sales

References

External links

 Crime of the Century (Adobe Flash) at Radio3Net (streamed copy where licensed)
 Crime Of The Century (Reissue Remastered) (Adobe Flash) at Myspace (streamed copy where licensed)
 Crime of the century the rock opera 

 'School' Official Lyrics
 
 'Hide in Your Shell' Official Lyrics
 'Dreamer' Official Lyrics
 'If Everyone Was Listening' Official Lyrics

Supertramp albums
1974 albums
A&M Records albums
Albums produced by Ken Scott
Albums produced by Rick Davies
Albums produced by Roger Hodgson
Albums recorded at Trident Studios